Óttar or Ottar may refer to:

Ottar, a Swedish king who appears in Beowulf as Ohthere
Óttar (mythology), in Norse mythology, the protégé of Freya, and the subject of the Lay of Hyndla 
The dwarf Ótr is sometimes known as Óttarr
Ottar from Hålogaland, the Viking adventurer
Ottir Iarla (Earl Ottir), historical Norse-Gael of Waterford and probable settler of Cork
Jarl Ottar, earl of Götaland figuring in the Jomsvikinga Saga and in the Heimskringla
Óttarr svarti (Óttarr the Black), an 11th-century Icelandic court poet
Óttar of Dublin, 12th-century Norse-Gael king of Dublin

Given name
Ottar Brox (1932–), Norwegian politician for the Socialist Left Party
Ottar Dahl (1924–2011), Norwegian historian and historiographer
Ottar Fjærvoll (1914–1995), Norwegian politician from the Centre Party
Ottar Gjermundshaug (1925–1963), Norwegian skier who competed in the early 1950s
Ottar Grønvik (1916–2008), Norwegian philologist and runology scholar
Tor Ottar Karlsen (1950–), Norwegian politician for the Labour Party
Ottar Landfald (1919–2009), Norwegian politician for the Centre Party

See also
Cotter family
Cotter (surname)

Norwegian masculine given names